Eugenio Febus (born 10 April 1949) is a Puerto Rican boxer. He competed in the men's lightweight event at the 1968 Summer Olympics. At the 1968 Summer Olympics, he lost to Sayed Abdel Gadir of Sudan.

References

1949 births
Living people
Puerto Rican male boxers
Olympic boxers of Puerto Rico
Boxers at the 1968 Summer Olympics
People from Santurce, Puerto Rico
Lightweight boxers